Dolichognatha proserpina is a species of long-jawed orb weaver in the spider family Tetragnathidae. It is found in Brazil.

References

Tetragnathidae
Articles created by Qbugbot
Spiders described in 1943